Dev is an Indian actor who works primarily in the Bengali film industry. He made his acting debut with the Bengali film Agnishapath. He later signed up Ravi Kinnagi's Bengali film I Love You.

As actor

As producer

Special Appearances

As singer

Music

Awards and nominations
 List of awards and nominations received by Dev (Bengali actor)

References

External links
 Filmography of Dev on IMDb

Indian filmographies
Male actor filmographies
Filmography